Wiencek is a surname. Notable people with the surname include:

Henry Wiencek (born 1952), American journalist, historian and editor
Patrick Wiencek (born 1989), German handballer 
Tami Wiencek, American politician
Winfried Wiencek (born 1949), German deaf table tennis player